KRSY-FM (92.7 MHz) is a radio station broadcasting a Country music format. Licensed to La Luz, New Mexico, United States, the station is currently owned by Exciter Media , LLC.

References

External links
 

Country radio stations in the United States
RSY-FM